The Movement of the Free Spirit: General Considerations and Firsthand Testimony Concerning Some Brief Flowerings of Life in the Middle Ages, the Renaissance and, Incidentally, Our Own Time is a 1986 book by former Situationist International (SI) member Raoul Vaneigem published in English in 1998 by Zone Books.

Summary

Vaneigem documents a number of radical heretical religious movements that took place in Europe between the twelfth and sixteenth centuries.

See also
 Brethren of the Free Spirit

1986 non-fiction books
20th-century history books
French non-fiction books
History books about Europe
History books about Christianity
Works by Raoul Vaneigem